Tori Groves-Little (born 13 October 2000) is an Australian rules footballer who played for Brisbane and for Gold Coast in the AFL Women's competition (AFLW).

Early life
Groves-Little grew up in Logan, Queensland and attended Beenleigh State High School throughout their teenage years. They played junior football for the Beenleigh Buffaloes in the local Queensland competition in their younger years. They joined the Gold Coast Suns academy program at the age of 16 and became the youngest player to win the QWAFL best and fairest award at the age of 17.

Groves-Little is non-binary and uses they/them pronouns.

AFLW career
Groves-Little made their AFLW debut in Brisbane's round 2 game against Fremantle at Fremantle Oval on 10 February 2019. Following the 2019 season, they joined Gold Coast. In March 2023, Groves-Little was delisted by Gold Coast.

References

External links

2000 births
Living people
Sportspeople from Logan, Queensland
Australian rules footballers from Queensland
Brisbane Lions (AFLW) players
Gold Coast Football Club (AFLW) players
Australian LGBT sportspeople
LGBT players of Australian rules football
Non-binary sportspeople